Lorenzo Martinez is an American musician who won the Grammy Award for Best Tejano Album in 2009, for his work with Los Texmaniacs on Borders Y Bailes.

He grew up in southeast Los Angeles and "took up the vihuela guitar and the guitarrón acoustic bass and began playing Mexican music. He studied mariachi at UCLA with Natividad Cano of Mariachi los Camperos. At the same time, he started playing Texan-style orquesta tejana and rhythm and blues in East Los Angeles." Lorenzo was a core member of Los Rock Angels and currently performs with Los Texmaniacs in San Antonio, Texas, and Conjunto Los Pochos in Los Angeles, California.

References

Year of birth missing (living people)
Living people
Grammy Award winners
Tejano musicians
Guitarists from Los Angeles
American male guitarists
University of California, Los Angeles alumni
21st-century American guitarists
21st-century American male musicians